Haberlandt is a surname. Notable people with the surname include:

Friedrich J. Haberlandt (1826–1878), Austro-Hungarian scientist
Fritzi Haberlandt (born 1975), German actress
Gottlieb Haberlandt (1854–1945), Austrian botanist
Ludwig Haberlandt (1885–1932), Austrian scientist